The 1984 Louisiana World Exposition was a World's Fair held in New Orleans, Louisiana, United States. It was held 100 years after the city's earlier World's Fair, the World Cotton Centennial in 1884.  It opened on Saturday, May 12, 1984, and ended on Sunday, November 11, 1984.  Its theme was "The World of Rivers—Fresh Waters as a Source of Life".

Plagued with attendance problems, the 1984 Louisiana World Exposition was the only exposition to declare bankruptcy during its run. Many blamed the low attendance on the fact that it was staged just two years and two states from Knoxville's 1982 World's Fair, and because it coincided with the 1984 Summer Olympics in Los Angeles. Others believe that the 1982 opening of Walt Disney World's EPCOT Center may have also drawn more people to Orlando, Florida. There has not been a World's Fair in the United States since the exposition in New Orleans as of 2022.

This expo also had the distinction of being the first World Exposition in the history of expos to have an official fair mascot. Seymore D. Fair, a large white costume pelican, became one of the most recognizable figures of any modern-day World Exposition.

The Fair
The government of Louisiana spent $5 million on the fair; that amount was overseen by Ralph Perlman, the state budget director, who tried to obtain maximum use of the funds. An  site along the Mississippi River was cleared of rundown warehouses, replaced by the structures of the Fair. This was to be a "Class B" exposition as defined by the Bureau International des Expositions (BIE), the international body governing world's fairs. There were no major exhibits such as had been seen at the 1964-65 New York World's Fair, which started predictions that the fair could be a flop. Although 7 million guests toured the fair, it was not enough to recoup the $350 million spent to host the event. Paychecks started bouncing, and it was only through government intervention that the gates remained open through the scheduled run. The fair drew 30,000 fewer people in the first month than was predicted.
One of the fair's more famous attractions was the Mississippi Aerial River Transit (MART). This was a gondola lift that took visitors across the Mississippi River from the fair site in the Warehouse District to Algiers on the West Bank. Also on display was the Space Shuttle Enterprise; in contrast, the US Coast Guard sail training barque  was open for tours adjacent to the shuttle for the week immediately before the official opening and the week after.

The Fair was held along the Mississippi River front near the New Orleans Central Business District, on a site that was formerly a railroad yard. While the Fair itself was a financial failure, several old warehouses were renovated for the fair, which helped to revitalize the adjacent Old Warehouse District. The fair suffered from poor attendance, but many New Orleanians have fond memories of their fair experiences. Highlights included a monorail, a gondola across the Mississippi River, an aquacade, an amphitheater for concerts, the Wonderwall, and the mascot Seymore D. Fair (also commonly spelled Seymour D' Fair). There also were many dining choices, including the Italian Village, the Japanese Pavilion, and Pete Fountain's Reunion Hall.

 visited the fair and was open for tourist visits while much of the crew enjoyed liberty.

USS Harlan County LST-1196 visited the fair for three days and was open for tourist visits, while much of the crew enjoyed liberty.

Legacy
Some traces of the fair remain today. In the Warehouse District, many of the streets were improved and many old buildings were renovated for businesses that hoped to cater to fair guests. These buildings later were converted to commercial and residential uses. These improvements paved the way for the city's arts district seen today.

The Riverwalk Marketplace and the Ernest N. Morial Convention Center is perhaps the fair's greatest legacy. The exhibition hall of the convention center was the fair's Louisiana Pavilion, it later reopened as a convention center in 1985. Next to the convention center on the corner of Tchoupitoulas and Henderson streets is a steel and fiberglass bust of Neptune and the head of one of his alligators. At the fair, the statues of Neptune, a mermaid and some alligators surrounding them made up Bridge Gate, one of the entrances to the fair. Most other structures and the MART were demolished after the fair closed. The monorails were moved to Florida and re-used at Zoo Miami. Despite its problems, the fair is fondly remembered by many New Orleans residents, particularly for its noteworthy post-modern architecture, such as the groundbreaking Wonderwall designed by noted architect Charles Willard Moore and his partner William Turnbull.

A bronze copy of Ivan Meštrović's statue Christ and the Samaritan Woman was exhibited at the Vatican pavilion and is found today at the Notre Dame Seminary in New Orleans.

On November 11, 2014, on the Fair's 30th Anniversary, a large bronze commemorative plaque was unveiled at the corner of Julia Street and Convention Center Boulevard, the heart of the world fair site.

Gallery

See also 
 Mississippi Aerial River Transit
 List of world expositions
 List of world's fairs

Notes

External links 

 Official website of the BIE
 European Patent Office
 The Times-Picayune in 175 years - 1984: New Orleans plays host to the world's fair
 ExpoMuseum's 1984 Louisiana World Exposition Section
 Video to promote attendance of the 1984 New Orleans World's Fair
 Exposición Internacional 1984 Nueva Orleans

Louisiana World Exposition
History of Louisiana
1980s in New Orleans
World's fairs in Louisiana
1984 in science
1984 festivals
Events in New Orleans